King Leo may refer to:

 Leo I, King of Armenia (1150–1219), sometimes also referred to as Leo II, to be distinguished from Leo I, Prince of Armenia
 Leo II, King of Armenia (1236–1289), sometimes also referred to as Leo III
 Leo III, King of Armenia (1286–1307), sometimes also referred to as Leo IV
 Leo IV, King of Armenia (1309–1341), sometimes also referred to as Leo V
 Leo V, King of Armenia (1342–1393), sometimes also referred to as Leo VI
 King Leo, main antagonist in the videogame Savage Reign